Dioscorea ovinala is a species of yam in the family Dioscoreaceae. It is endemic to Madagascar and grows mostly in dry deciduous forests.

Uses
Dioscorea ovinala is important to the Malagasy people as food and medicine. This species is also used as a starch source.

References

ovinala
Taxa named by John Gilbert Baker